Mickey Gilbert is an American rodeo performer and film stunt man.

Gilbert has been Robert Redford's stuntman on Redford films beginning with Butch Cassidy and the Sundance Kid (1969), through The Old Man & the Gun (1988). In the trailer for The Old Man & the Gun, Redford says that he and Gilbert "were in the same class in the same high school in the San Fernando Valley, and then many, many years later, he showed up in my life again as the stunt double in Butch Cassidy, so from that point on   he's been in all my films since."

Some of Gilbert's best known stunt roles are the leap off a cliff into water as the Robert Redford character in Butch Cassidy and the Sundance Kid; jumping from a moving train to a signal post as the Gene Wilder character in Silver Streak; rolling down a hill together with the horse he was mounted on The Return of a Man Called Horse; and leaping on horseback off a cliff into water in the Gene Wilder role in The Frisco Kid. Gilbert also appeared as a horse rider stunt performer in the 1980 TV movie Stunts Unlimited.

Later in his career he worked as a stunt coordinator.

Portrayed the Ripper in the first episode of Kolchak the Night Stalker.

References

Living people
American male film actors
American stunt performers
Non-traditional rodeo performers
Year of birth missing (living people)